Johannes Fuks (also Johan(nes) Kalda; 23 November 1890 Tahkuranna Parish (now Häädemeeste Parish), Kreis Pernau – 18 June 1977 Uulu Selsoviet, Pärnu District) was an Estonian politician. He was a member of III and V Riigikogu.

References

1890 births
1977 deaths
People from Häädemeeste Parish
People from Kreis Pernau
Settlers' Party politicians
Members of the Riigikogu, 1926–1929
Members of the Riigikogu, 1929–1932
Members of the Riigikogu, 1932–1934